Sky-Hi Nunataks is a nunatak group 8 nautical miles (15 km) long, located 11 nautical miles (20 km) east of Grossman Nunataks and northeast of Merrick Mountains in Palmer Land, extending from Doppler Nunatak in the west to Arnoldy Nunatak in the east and including Mount Mende, Mount Lanzerotti, Mount Carrara, and Mount Cahill.

History
The nunataks were first seen and photographed from the air by Ronne Antarctic Research Expedition (RARE), 1947–48.

The name derives from the United States Antarctic Research Program (USARP) project Sky-Hi, in which Camp Sky-Hi (later designated Eights Station) was set up in Ellsworth Land in November 1961 as a conjugate point station to carry on simultaneous measurements of the earth's magnetic field and of the ionosphere. Sky-Hi's conjugate point in the Northern Hemisphere is located in the Réserve faunique des Laurentides, in Canada.

The nunataks were mapped in detail by United States Geological Survey (USGS) from ground surveys and U.S. Navy aerial photographs taken 1965-67 and U.S. Landsat imagery taken 1973–74.

Nunataks of Palmer Land